Zhelyazkov is a Bulgarian masculine surname, its feminine counterpart is Zhelyazkova. It may refer to:

 Andrey Zhelyazkov (born 1952), Bulgarian footballer
 Binka Zhelyazkova (1923–2011), Bulgarian film director
 Dimitar Zhelyazkov (born 1970), Bulgarian criminal
 Dobri Zhelyazkov (1800–1865), Bulgarian businessman
 Yordan Zhelyazkov (born Sofia, Bulgaria), author of the fantasy novel When They Shine Brightest

See also
 Yevgeni Zhelyakov (born 1976), Russian footballer

Bulgarian-language surnames